Night Visions is an American television horror anthology series, with each episode comprising two half-hour stories dealing with themes of the supernatural or simply the dark side of human nature. It was produced by Warner Bros. Television for the Fox network, originally airing from 2001 to 2002. Musician Henry Rollins was the uncredited host of the show.

Production
Filming for the show began during July 2000 in Vancouver, Canada. Veteran punk and metal singer Henry Rollins got hired as host after discussions with Fox executives, who initially wanted him to play a recurring role on their popular sci-fi series The X-Files. In a 2001 interview, Rollins remarked "It's kind of a Twilight Zone-thing and I'm the Rod Serling. It's awesome. I got the job last year, and I'm working on it now and again up in Vancouver. Really nice people, really good material. That's the best part of it, really. If it's bad material it doesn't matter how much money they're throwing at you, it's not worth it."

Originally, Night Visions was not going to feature a host. Co-creator Billy Brown (a former writer of the 1990s Goosebumps TV series) stated, "I never wanted a host. There should have been an introductory voice-over, a la Outer Limits. But the network said 'No host, no show'. So we started looking, and actually got a commitment from Gary Oldman. Having played Dracula, and being a fantastic actor, he would have been a real presence. The network said no. They wanted Henry Rollins. I didn't get it, nor did anyone else on the show's staff. It seemed like someone's desperate idea to make the show hip". Regarding Fox's involvement in the creative process, Brown said "They [Fox] said many conflicting things. We had a chance to option an incredible Dean Koontz short story that was just terrifying, and they nixed that because it was too scary. And yet they complained that other stories weren't scary enough."

The show's directors included some best known for feature films, including Tobe Hooper and Joe Dante, and others, such as Brian Dennehy, JoBeth Williams, and Bill Pullman, known primarily as actors.

Broadcast history
The show was scheduled to debut during October 2000 at 8:00 p.m. on Fridays, but this never eventuated, with reality show Police Chase and Freakylinks airing in its place. It eventually aired on Fox from July 12 to September 6, 2001 as a summer filler. Billy Brown reflected "There was a changing of the guard at Fox between the time we filmed the pilot and the time the network was ready to order the series. The new regime wasn't convinced an anthology would work, yet everyone agreed that the pilot was good. I had the feeling the network didn't think the show was hip enough."

It was later picked up by the Sci Fi Channel, which reran the series beginning June 14, 2002. During September 2002, Sci Fi broadcast the final three remaining episodes that never aired on Fox. One of these, "Cargo/Switch", ran as part of the Night Visions series, while the two other episodes' segments ("Patterns", "The Maze", "Harmony" and "Voices") were edited into the Sci Fi Channel film Shadow Realm, minus the Rollins introductions and the Night Visions name. Reruns of the series also aired on the Nine Network in Australia and on cable channel Chiller.

The show has never been released on DVD or streaming.

Reception
The Washington Post labelled Night Visions a "creepy relief from reality". Michael Speier of Variety praised the show in his 2001 review, commenting "[It] is too good to get lost in the land of summer reruns. Show was bumped from the network's fall schedule last year, proving once again that execs have zero tolerance for anthology series. What a mistake — it's one of the most genuinely edgy shows on television, and it could find an audience with the right promotional push." The Pittsburgh Post-Gazette had a more negative review, criticizing "laughable narration from meathead rocker Henry Rollins and an overreliance on violent plot twists".

Night Visions has since been favorably compared to other horror/sci-fi anthology shows, particularly The Twilight Zone, although The Washington Post claimed at the time that it was "far more graphic and scary". In 2018, Bloody Disgusting labelled it a "damn good horror anthology series", while HorrorNews.net reflected in 2020 that the show was "unceremoniously dumped by Fox without a fair chance to find an audience".

Episodes
13 color episodes in 43-minute format (not counting commercials):

Notes
1.  Based on the short story Window by Bob Leman (credited as Robert Leman).
2.  Although this is the title as given in the story's introduction, it is alternatively listed in the credits as "My So Called Life & Death".

References

External links
 

2000s American horror television series
2000s American anthology television series
2001 American television series debuts
2002 American television series endings
American fantasy television series
Fox Broadcasting Company original programming
Horror fiction television series
Television series by Warner Bros. Television Studios
English-language television shows
Television shows filmed in Vancouver